Milan Šteindler (born 12 April 1957) is a Czech actor, screenwriter, and film director. He is a graduate of the Academy of Performing Arts in Prague. He won the Czech Lion Award for Best Director for his 1994 film, Thanks for Every New Morning. He obtained the Silver St. George Award for Directing at the 19th Moscow International Film Festival for the same film.

Together with David Vávra, he founded Sklep Theatre in Prague in 1971.

Along with Petr Čtvrtníček and Vávra, Šteindler wrote and directed the satirical television series Czech Soda. As an actor, he has appeared in over sixty films.

Selected filmography

Awards and recognition
 Czech Lion Award for Best Director for Thanks for Every New Morning, 1994
 Silver St. George Award for Directing, Moscow International Film Festival, 1995

References

External links

 

1957 births
Living people
Czech film directors
Czech male film actors
Male actors from Prague